Cadillac Place, formerly the General Motors Building, is a landmark high-rise office complex located at 3044 West Grand Boulevard in the New Center area of Detroit, Michigan. It was renamed for the French founder of Detroit, Antoine Laumet de La Mothe, sieur de Cadillac. It is a National Historic Landmark in Michigan, listed in 1985.

History

General Motors Building

After much pressure by the General Motors Board of Directors, William C. Durant agreed in 1919 to construct a permanent headquarters in Detroit for the company he formed in 1908. The corporation purchased the block between Cass and Second on West Grand Boulevard and removed the 48 structures from the site to begin work.

Groundbreaking was held June 2, 1919 and the Cass Avenue wing was ready for occupancy in November 1920 while the remainder of the building was under construction. The building was originally named for Durant, but an internal power struggle led to his ouster in 1921 and the structure was renamed the General Motors Building. However, the initial "D" had already been carved above the main entrance and in several other places on the building where they remain today.

The structure was completed in 1922, and served as General Motors world headquarters from 1923 until 2001. It is approximately 2 miles to the southwest of Detroit/Hamtramck Assembly, where Cadillacs are currently built.

New Center Development
In 2001, GM moved the last of its employees into the Renaissance Center on the Detroit River. In 1999, General Motors transferred the property to New Center Development, Inc., a non-profit venture controlled by TrizecHahn Office Properties which acted as developer and began renovation on the upper floors which GM vacated in 2000. The Annex was constructed shortly after the main building, and in the 1940s, it was connected to the adjacent Argonaut Building with a pedestrian bridge on the fourth floor. A parking structure was constructed to the east across Cass Avenue and also connected with a pedestrian bridge. A third bridge was constructed across Grand Boulevard in the early 1980s, to connect the building with New Center One and the St. Regis Hotel.

Government of Michigan—Cadillac Place
The building now houses several Government of Michigan agencies, originally, under a 20-year lease agreement approved in 1998. At the end of the lease, the State had the option to purchase the structure for $1. In 2011 the Michigan Economic Development Corporation (State of Michigan) purchased the building.

The building's 2000-2002 renovation, to house State offices, was one of the nation's largest historic renovation projects. When the renovation project was completed it was renamed Cadillac Place as a tribute to Detroit's founder, Antoine Laumet de La Mothe, sieur de Cadillac.

Cadillac Place currently houses over 2,000 State employees including the Michigan Court of Appeals for District I. The building's former executive office suite serves as the Detroit office for Michigan's governor and attorney general, and several Justices of the Michigan Supreme Court have offices in the building.

Architecture
The building has 31 elevators. Designated a National Historic Landmark on June 2, 1978, it is an exquisite example of Neoclassical architecture.

Designed by architect Albert Kahn, the structure consists of a two-story base with four parallel 15-story wings connecting to a central perpendicular backbone. Kahn used this design to allow sunlight and natural ventilation to reach each of the building's hundreds of individual offices. The entire building is faced in limestone and is crowned with a two-story Corinthian colonnade. In 1923, it opened as the second largest office building in the world (behind the Equitable Building in New York City).

The base of the building is surrounded by an arched colonnade supported by Ionic columns. The entrance is set into a loggia behind three arches of the Grand Boulevard facade. It intersects the arcade to form a large elevator lobby with a coffered ceiling.

Interiors
The interior features a vaulted arcade. Floors on the ground level are gray Tennessee marble. The arcade was originally lined by stores and an auditorium which could be used for corporate functions or by community groups. The auditorium space was later converted into an auto showroom. On the upper stories, floors are also gray Tennessee marble, while corridor walls are covered in the original white Alabama marble.

On the lower level two swimming pools were located, one was converted into a cafeteria. Tile with a water theme gives a hint to the original use of the cafeteria space. A depressed driveway extending between Cass and Second divides the lower level of the main building from the lower level of the Annex.

When the Fisher Building was constructed across Grand Boulevard in 1927, the two were connected with an underground pedestrian tunnel that also connects north to the New Center Building. They allow employees and visitors to traverse between the three buildings without going outdoors into inclement weather.

Annex Building
To the south of the main building is the five-story Annex which served as the original home of General Motors Research Laboratory. In 1930, the laboratories moved across Milwaukee Avenue to the Art Deco Argonaut Building. For many years after the Annex housed the Chevrolet Central Office. In 2009 when the Argonaut Building was sold, a fourth-floor pedestrian bridge connecting the two was removed and the Annex facade was restored.

Renovation
Between 2000 and 2002, the General Motors Building was thoroughly renovated to house the State of Michigan offices. Architect Eric J. Hill participated in the redevelopment which was headed by Albert Kahn and Associates, the original architects. In addition to upgrading existing systems, reconfiguring some spaces and redecorating, the project installed central air conditioning. When the building was first occupied, it was cooled in the warmer months by opening windows. Later, General Motors installed window units to cool various offices and work areas. During the renovation, large-scale systems replaced almost 1,900 window units that were left when GM vacated the structure.

Photo gallery

See also

 Fisher Building
 Henry Ford Hospital
 New Center, Detroit
 Penobscot Building
 Wayne State University
 List of National Historic Landmarks in Michigan
 National Register of Historic Places listings in Detroit

References

Further reading

External links
 New Center Council
 Esmagazine.com: The Mechanical Modernization Of A Classical Icon 
 Buildingphotos.com 

Skyscraper office buildings in Detroit
Government buildings in Michigan
General Motors facilities
Headquarters in the United States
National Historic Landmarks in Metro Detroit
National Register of Historic Places in Detroit
Office buildings completed in 1921
Neoclassical architecture in Michigan
1920 establishments in Michigan
Albert Kahn (architect) buildings